Rhythm is the fourth full-length album by Swedish husband and wife duo Wildbirds & Peacedrums, released on The Leaf Label on 3 November 2014.

Background
Rhythm was written, recorded and produced by Mariam Wallentin and Andreas Werliin in their Stockholm studio and focuses almost exclusively on Wallentin's vocals and Werliin's percussion. "Sound-wise we wanted it to feel like a live experience," Werliin explained in an interview. "Almost every song is one take. We recorded standing in the same room, no screens or isolation, looking each other in the eyes."
The band described how after several busy years of touring they wanted to make a "going back to our roots" album, recorded in their own space with no time limits or external pressures.

Critical reception

On the Metacritic website, which aggregates reviews from critics and assigns a normalised rating out of 100, Rhythm received a score of 81, based on 2 mixed and 9 positive reviews.
All About Jazz wrote that "Rhythm has rhythm, but it's also brimming over with melody, harmony and drama" and also praised Wallentin and Werliin's production, saying that it "gives the sound such richness and strength that its energy is almost palpable".

The Line Of Best Fit also commented on Werliin and Wallentin's approach of working on the album without any producers or external influences, describing the album as "at times almost uncomfortably intimate, with the duo's relationship - working and otherwise - obviously a major inspiration for the material." However, the journalist writes that through the "frustrations and tensions but also the release and the joy of crafting these odd, compelling sounds in a small space with a person you already spend an awful lot of time with...Their sweat and toil is the listener's gain….Rhythm must belong amongst the year's more impressive releases".

The Skinny wrote that the album sounded "ancient and thrillingly modern….as Andreas Werlin builds rhythms from soft shakers and hollow echoes, Mariam Wallentin delivers a soulful vocal that glides up and down octaves", but also commented that "[some] tracks take more time to reveal themselves, and this furtiveness occasionally threatens to douse Rhythm’s fireworks in a low dose of monotony. But excellence elsewhere counteracts the odd slump, with highlights ranging from Mind Blues’ curious clangs to Soft Wind, Soft Death’s jittery gospel".

Track listing

Personnel 
 Mariam Wallentin — vocals
 Andreas Werliin — drums and percussion

References 

2014 albums
Wildbirds & Peacedrums albums
The Leaf Label albums